JCO as an acronym may stand for:

 JCO (company), a Japanese nuclear fuel cycle company involved in the Tokaimura nuclear accident
 Jamaican Caves Organisation
 Jewish Combat Organization, a Jewish resistance group during World War II
 Journal of Clinical Oncology, a leading medical journal
 Joyce Carol Oates, American author
 Junior commissioned officer, a group of military ranks in the armies of India and Pakistan
 Junkers, a former German aircraft manufacturer